Suzanne Campbell is an Irish television director, producer and food writer. The Irish Independent has described her as one of "the most important, well-informed voices in Irish food".

She produced the television series What Are You Eating?, based on her book Basket Case: What's Happening to Ireland's Food?. She also worked on Ear to the Ground and is a member of the Irish Food Writers' Guild.

Her parents are from Northern Ireland. She grew up in Bray, County Wicklow. She has two daughters. She lived in Asia for a while and also travelled in Africa and India. She is married to Philip Boucher-Hayes. In March 2020, she contracted COVID-19 and required hospital treatment.

References

Food writers
Irish television directors
Irish television producers
Irish non-fiction writers
Irish women non-fiction writers
Living people
Year of birth missing (living people)
Women television directors
Irish women television producers